Glodeni is a commune in Dâmbovița County, Muntenia, Romania, with a population of 4,449 people. It is composed of six villages: Glodeni, Gușoiu, Lăculețe, Livezile, Malu Mierii, and Schela.

References

Communes in Dâmbovița County
Localities in Muntenia